Xylorycta sucina is a moth in the family Xyloryctidae. It was described by Turner in 1939. It is found in Australia, where it has been recorded from Tasmania and Victoria.

References

Xylorycta
Moths described in 1939